Dark Hope is a 2010 album of indie rock titles sung by opera soprano Renée Fleming.

The album was the idea of Peter Mensch and Cliff Burnstein; after listening to Fleming's performance of "In the Pines" on Elvis Costello's TV show Spectacle, they approached Fleming and producer David Kahne. The aim was not to produce a typical crossover album, but a collection of songs sung without any hint of operatic vocal strength.

Track listing

Charts

Credits

Performance credits
Rusty Anderson, Nick Valensi – guitar
David Kahne – bass, guitar, keyboards
Will Lee – bass
Shawn Pelton – drums
Jesse Mills, Cyrus Beroukhin – violin
Dov Scheindlin, William Hakim – viola
Wendy Sutter – cello
Alexis Pia Gerlach – cello
Amelia Ross, Sage Ross, Rachelle Fleming – background vocals
Mike Rossi – conductor

Technical credits
Roy Hendrickson – engineer
David Kahne – arranger, programming, producer, engineer
Rebecca Meek – art direction

References

External links
Renée Fleming: Dark Hope
"Opera Star Renée Fleming Takes on Arcade Fire, Death Cab for Cutie on 'Dark Hope'" by Daniel Kreps, Rolling Stone (25 February 2010)

2010 albums
Indie rock albums by American artists
Decca Records albums
Covers albums
Albums produced by David Kahne
Renée Fleming albums